Mays Landing is an unincorporated community and census-designated place (CDP) located within Hamilton Township, Atlantic County, in the U.S. state of New Jersey. At the 2010 U.S. census, May's Landing's population was 2,135. It is the county seat of Atlantic County. The community was named for Captain George May, who sailed the Great Egg Harbor River in 1740, and purchased land in the area in 1756.

Geography
According to the U.S. Census Bureau, Mays Landing had a total area of 1.885 square miles (4.881 km2), including 1.660 square miles (4.299 km2) of land and 0.225 square miles (0.581 km2) of water (11.91%).

Climate
The climate in this area is characterized by hot, humid summers and generally mild to cool winters.  According to the Köppen Climate Classification system, Mays Landing has a humid subtropical climate, abbreviated "Cfa" on climate maps.

Demographics

2010 census

2000 census
At the 2000 census, there were 2,321 people, 892 households and 599 families residing in the CDP. The population density was 527.1/km2 (1,362.8/mi2). There were 952 housing units at an average density of 216.2/km2 (559.0/mi2). The racial makeup of the CDP was 91.25% White, 5.00% African American, 0.09% Native American, 0.73% Asian, 0.22% Pacific Islander, 0.78% from other races, and 1.94% from two or more races. Hispanic or Latino of any race were 3.96% of the population.

There were 892 households, of which 33.9% had children under the age of 18 living with them, 49.2% were married couples living together, 14.5% had a female householder with no husband present, and 32.8% were non-families. 27.4% of all households were made up of individuals, and 10.3% had someone living alone who was 65 years of age or older. The average household size was 2.55 and the average family size was 3.12.

25.4% of the population were under the age of 18, 7.2% from 18 to 24, 30.9% from 25 to 44, 23.1% from 45 to 64, and 13.4% who were 65 years of age or older. The median age was 37 years. For every 100 females, there were 93.1 males. For every 100 females age 18 and over, there were 88.3 males.

The median household income was $52,628 and the median family income was $60,000. Males had a median income of $41,432 compared with $30,154 for females. The per capita income for the CDP was $23,477. About 4.9% of families and 6.8% of the population were below the poverty line, including 14.1% of those under age 18 and 3.0% of those age 65 or over. The Atlantic County Special Services School is a public school which services students with disabilities from the ages of 3 1/2 to 21.

Education
Mays Landing is served by Oakcrest High School, part of the Greater Egg Harbor Regional High School District. Schools operated by the Hamilton Township Schools are William Davies Middle School, the George L. Hess Educational complex and the Shaner School.

The Atlantic County Institute of Technology, established in 1974 and located on a campus covering , provides vocational instruction to high school students and adults from across Atlantic County, and was one of eight schools in the state recognized in 2008 as a Blue Ribbon School by the United States Department of Education.

Saint Vincent de Paul Regional School is a Catholic elementary school in Mays Landing, serving students in pre-kindergarten through eighth grade since 1961 and operated under the jurisdiction of the Diocese of Camden.

Atlantic Cape Community College was the second community college to be established in New Jersey, and moved to its campus in Mays Landing in February 1968 where it now serves students from both Atlantic County and Cape May County.

Transportation
NJ Transit provides bus service to Philadelphia on the 315 route and to Atlantic City on the  553 route.

Winery
 Balic Winery

Notable people

People who were born in, residents of, or otherwise closely associated with Mays Landing include:
 Brandon Bell (born 1995), former linebacker for the Penn State Nittany Lions football team. Signed by the Cincinnati Bengals in 2017 after going undrafted.
 Cory Bird (born 1978), football safety who played for the Indianapolis Colts.
 Ilsley Boone (1879–1968), established and ran the national headquarters of the American Sunbathing Association at Sunshine Park (which operated from 1931 to 1983) in Mays Landing.
 Darhyl Camper (born 1990), singer-songwriter and record producer.
 Suzette Charles (born 1963), singer and entertainer, who became Miss America 1984
 Carmen Cincotti (born 1992), competitive eater.
 Darren Drozdov (born 1969), former wrestler for WWE and NFL player for the Denver Broncos
 Mae Faggs (1932–2000), track-and-field athlete who was a gold medalist in the Women's 4 × 100 meters relay at 1952 Summer Olympics.
 Ronnie Faisst (born 1977), professional freestyle motocross and snow bikecross rider.
 Bo Melton, American football wide receiver for the Rutgers Scarlet Knights.
 William Moore (1810–1878), who served in the United States House of Representatives, where he represented New Jersey's 1st congressional district from 1867 to 1871
 Sharon Kay Penman (born 1945), historical novelist.
 Graciela Rivera (1921–2011), first Puerto Rican to sing a lead role at the Metropolitan Opera.
 Laurie Zaleski, founder of the Funny Farm Rescue & Sanctuary

References

External links

 The Current of Mays Landing
 Rutgers at Atlantic Cape Community College

Census-designated places in Atlantic County, New Jersey
County seats in New Jersey
Hamilton Township, Atlantic County, New Jersey